Affliction Clothing is an American clothing manufacturer and retailer based in Seal Beach, California. It was launched in 2005 by Courtney Dubar and partners, and is now owned by Affliction Holdings LLC. The company offers a wide range of products, including t-shirts, hoodies, swimwear, headwear, and watches.

History 
Prior to the founding of the company, Courtney Dubar had designed and printed merch designs for his brother Pat's band Uniform Choice, using a screen printer he had purchased himself in a shed in his parents' back garden. Affliction Clothing was launched in August 2005 by Dubar, Todd Beard, Nicole Behrle, Eric Foss, and Clifton Chason.  In 2012, Courtney Dubar (current CEO) bought Todd Beard's portions of the company, making him majority shareholder of Affliction Clothing.

Products 
Affliction's clothing line includes men's and women's T-shirts, polo shirts, thermals, button downs, hoodies, denim, dresses, watches, headwear, shorts, and swimwear. While the company has deep roots in the MMA community, its "Live Fast" motto represents and appeals to audiences who appreciate a variety of disciplines and eras such as Rock & Roll, Moto Culture, Tattoo, Vintage Americana, Mixed Martial Arts and Impact Sports. The Signature Series of Affliction shirts bear the logos of many of the world's top-ranked MMA fighters, including Randy Couture, Georges St-Pierre, Fedor Emelianenko, Quinton Jackson, and Renato Sobral and boxers, including Oscar De La Hoya, Shane Mosley, and Zab Judah. Affliction has also produced signature shirts in collaboration with musicians like Avenged Sevenfold, Ozzy Osbourne, Black Sabbath, Megadeth, Pantera, Korn, Staind, Static-X, Testament, Shadows Fall, Atreyu, Behemoth, and Biohazard. Designs incorporate graphic images of angel wings, roses, skulls, skeletons, crosses, and swords.

Affliction was a longtime sponsor of the Ultimate Fighting Championship (UFC) and its fighters, until 2008, when it broke ranks and formed Affliction Entertainment to compete with the UFC. As a result, UFC banned its fighters from wearing Affliction branded clothing.

American Fighter 
American Fighter is a clothing and sports equipment company.  Trademarked in 2006, it became a registered trademark of Affliction Holdings LLC on April 22, 2008.  Several fighters have been sponsored by this sub brand, including Rich Franklin.

Rebel Saints 
Rebel Saints was trademarked by Affliction Holdings LLC on September 27, 2011.  The line of clothing is sold primarily at Spencer's Gifts.

Sinful 
Sinful is a clothing line specifically designed for women, as part of Affliction Inc., and is the sister brand to Affliction men's clothing. Its T-shirts, pants, and hoodies often feature a mix of spirited elements, including angels, angel wings, doves, crosses, burning hearts, roses and skulls.

Throwdown 
Throwdown was founded as a hard goods company, positioning its products and services within the market of Mixed Martial Arts and the Combative Sports Industry. Affliction joined forces with Throwdown to develop a full clothing brand in order to complement the already successful hard goods line with items such as protective gear, training bags, cages and rings. Throwdown clothing is sold internationally.

Xtreme Couture 
Xtreme Couture clothing was founded in 2006 by Affliction, in a partnership with Randy Couture.

Sponsorship 
In June 2011, Affliction sponsored a photo contest in which the prize was a custom Harley-Davidson worth $25,000 or $12,000. These motorcycles were:
 A men's 2010 Harley-Davidson Softail ‘crossbones’ American Customs Harley-Davidson customized Motorcycle with 1584 Twin cam 96B counterbalanced engine – worth about $25,000 after customizations.
 A women's 2010 Sportster 883 American Customs Harley-Davidson customized Motorcycle with Low Rubber mounted 883cc Evolution engine  - worth about $12,000 after customizations.

See also
Mixed martial arts clothing

References

External links
 

Clothing companies of the United States
Sporting goods manufacturers of the United States
Sportswear brands
Companies based in Orange County, California
Seal Beach, California
American companies established in 2005
Clothing companies established in 2005
2005 establishments in California